Amanikhatashan was a ruling queen of Kush (c. 62-c. 85 CE). As a Queen, her proper title was "Kandake". Her pyramid is at Meroe in the Sudan. She was preceded by Amanitenmemide (c. 50–62) and succeeded by Teritnide.

Amanikhatashan provided aid to Rome during the First Jewish–Roman War (66-73 CE), sending cavalry and likely also archers.

References

1st-century monarchs of Kush
Queens of Kush
1st-century women rulers